Ady Stern is an Israeli physicist.

Adiel (Ady) Stern (born 1960) is a professor at the Condensed Matter Physics Department at the Weizmann Institute of Science. Stern and fellow researchers claim to have demonstrated the existence of 'quasiparticles' with one quarter the charge of an electron.

Stern is best known for his research relating to the theoretical aspects of the fractional quantum Hall effect and the properties of quasiparticles that have one-quarter the charge of an electron.

Published works
Topological Quantum Computation—From Basic Concepts to First Experiments

See also
Science and technology in Israel

References

External links
Ady Stern home page
"Coulomb Drag at the Half-filled Landau Level" (audio presentation by Ady Stern)

Israeli physicists
Academic staff of Weizmann Institute of Science
Living people
Jewish physicists
1960 births
Fellows of the American Physical Society